Delaware Township is one of nine townships in Hamilton County, Indiana, United States. As of the 2010 census, its population was 30,617 and it contained 13,553 housing units. Records show the township to have had 43,352 residents in 2007.

History
Delaware Township was organized in 1823.

Geography
The streams of Weaver Creek, Home Run, Britton Branch, Shoemaker Ditch, Smock Creek, Light Branch, Delight Creek, Cheeney Creek, Hare Creek, Eller Run, Heath Ditch, and Behner Brook run through this township.

Cities and towns
 Noblesville (south edge of Noblesville)
 Fishers (west half of Fishers)

Adjacent townships
 Noblesville Township (north)
 Fall Creek Township (east)
 Lawrence Township, Marion County (south)
 Washington Township, Marion County (southwest)
 Clay Township (west)

Cemeteries
The township contains four cemeteries: Eller, Heady Lane, Oaklawn Memorial Gardens, and Spannuth.

Major highways
 Interstate 69
 State Road 37

Airports and landing strips
 Beaver Airstrip
 Indianapolis Metropolitan Airfield

Education
Delaware Township residents may obtain a free library card from the Hamilton East Public Library in Noblesville.

See also
List of Indiana townships

References
 
 United States Census Bureau cartographic boundary files

External links
 Indiana Township Association
 United Township Association of Indiana

Townships in Hamilton County, Indiana
Townships in Indiana